52 Tuesdays is a 2013 Australian coming of age drama film directed by Sophie Hyde, with the screenplay written by Matthew Cormack and story by Cormack and Hyde. The film centres on a teenage girl dealing with the gender transition of a parent. The film showed at the 2014 Sundance Film Festival,  where it was not only nominated for the Grand Jury Prize, but won the Best Director Award. Over the following year it won numerous other awards and garnered global critical acclaim.

Plot
16-year-old Billie lives in suburban Australia. One of her parents comes out to her as a transgender man named James. Billie then learns that James wants Billie to live with her other parent, James's ex-husband Tom, for a year. This restricts the time Billie is together with James to Tuesdays from 16:00 - 22:00, starting on 23 August. The film is divided into the corresponding 52 segments, each covering one Tuesday, and starting with a title card showing the date.

Each Tuesday, after visiting James and before returning to Tom, Billie has secret encounters with two older students, Josh and Jasmine, in an apartment that her uncle Harry allows them to use. Billie films sexual experiments of the threesome.

James meets a setback in his transition when his body does not tolerate testosterone injections, and he has to stop them.

After sending a nude photograph of herself to Jasmine, Billie gets into trouble as this is considered child pornography. The school principal, James, Tom and Jasmine strongly disapprove it. Billie is shocked that James destroys one of her tapes, and refuses further contact with him. Josh does not want physical contact with Billie anymore because of Tom's disapproval.

Later Billie is willing to destroy a remaining tape, but since it is in James's house who she no longer visits, she is dependent on Harry, who finally destroys it for her.

When the year is finished, Billie reconciles with James, and starts living with him again. Also Billie, Josh and Jasmine become friends again.

Cast
 Tilda Cobham-Hervey as Billie
 Del Herbert-Jane as James
 Mario Späte as Harry
 Beau Travis Williams as Tom
 Imogen Archer as Jasmine
 Sam Althuizen as Josh
 Danica Moors as Lisa

Production
52 Tuesdays was filmed in suburban Adelaide over the course of a year, every Tuesday, to fit in with the storyline of the film. This in itself made it unique. It was led by first-time actors and Hyde enjoyed the measure of intimacy and control that she had in the making of the film.

Release and reception

The film was released theatrically in Australia on 1 May 2014.

Critical response
52 Tuesdays was met with positive reviews from critics upon its premiere at the 2014 Sundance Film Festival and earning an initial 86% critics' approval rating on Rotten Tomatoes. , it has earned an 89% approval rating on Rotten Tomatoes.

Geoff Berkshire said in Variety that the film "Demonstrates a willingness to experiment that bodes well for future endeavors." David Rooney of The Hollywood Reporter in his review said "A thoughtful drama about a mother and daughter whose connection is tested as they both go through intense changes." Tom Clift of Concrete Playground gave a positive review, saying: "Honest, insightful and bravely against the grain, 52 Tuesdays is a magnificent debut for cast and filmmaker alike."

Accolades

References

External links

 
 
 52 Tuesdays at Closer Productions

2013 films
2013 drama films
2013 LGBT-related films
Australian drama films
Australian LGBT-related films
2010s English-language films
LGBT-related drama films
Films about trans men
Films set in South Australia
Sundance Film Festival award winners